Lisa Swain (born April 1958) is an American Democratic Party politician. A resident of Fair Lawn, she has represented the 38th Legislative District in the New Jersey General Assembly since 2018.

Swain serves in the Assembly on the Environment and Solid Waste Committee, the Law and Public Safety Committee and the Tourism, Gaming and the Arts Committee.

Political career
Swain was the Mayor of Fair Lawn for two terms and had previously been a member of Fair Lawn's council for 11 years. Swain and Chris Tully were appointed to the New Jersey General Assembly's 38th District seats after Assemblymen Joseph Lagana and Tim Eustace both resigned from their seats to move on to other positions. Swain won the special election to serve the rest of her term on November 6, 2018.

Committees 
Committee assignments for the current session are:
Appropriations, Chair
State and Local Government, Vice-Chair
Women and Children
Joint Budget Oversight

District 38 
Each of the 40 districts in the New Jersey Legislature has one representative in the New Jersey Senate and two members in the New Jersey General Assembly. The representatives from the 38th District for the 2022—23 Legislative Session are:
 Senator Joseph Lagana  (D)
 Assemblywoman Lisa Swain  (D)
 Assemblyman Chris Tully  (D)

References

External links
Legislative webpage

Living people
Democratic Party members of the New Jersey General Assembly
21st-century American politicians
People from Fair Lawn, New Jersey
Politicians from Bergen County, New Jersey
University of Rochester alumni
New York University alumni
Women mayors of places in New Jersey
Women state legislators in New Jersey
21st-century American women politicians
1958 births